General elections were held in Liberia in 1919. In the presidential election, the result was a victory for Charles D. B. King of the True Whig Party. King took office on 5 January 1920.

References

Liberia
1919 in Liberia
Elections in Liberia
Election and referendum articles with incomplete results